Stan Clayton (born January 31, 1965) is a former American football guard and tackle. He played for the Atlanta Falcons from 1988 to 1989 and for the New England Patriots in 1990 and 1991.

References

1965 births
Living people
American football offensive guards
American football offensive tackles
Penn State Nittany Lions football players
Atlanta Falcons players
New England Patriots players
Cherry Hill High School East alumni
People from Cherry Hill, New Jersey
Sportspeople from Camden County, New Jersey